John H. White may refer to:

John H. White (photojournalist) (born 1945), African-American photographer, winner of the Pulitzer Prize
John H. White (Medal of Honor), American soldier and Medal of Honor recipient
John H. White Jr., American historian and museum curator
John Hannibal White, South Carolina politician
John Hazen White, Episcopal bishop in Indiana
John Henry White (born 1955), Canadian football player
John Herbert White (1880–1920), co-author of Modern Chess Openings
John H. White (motorcycle racer), participant in the 1935 to 1939 Isle of Man TT motorcycle races
John Howard White, member of the 26th Legislative Assembly of Ontario and 29th Legislative Assembly of Ontario

See also
John White (disambiguation)